Welcome to the Videos is a video compilation originally released on VHS and VCD in 1998. It features music videos by the American rock group Guns N' Roses. All the videos featured were made between 1987 and 1994. In many ways, it is a video forerunner to their Greatest Hits compilation album of 2004. It was released on DVD in October 2003.

Licensing issues prevented the inclusion of the "You Could Be Mine" video, as it featured clips from Terminator 2: Judgment Day.

The release was certified 2× Platinum by the RIAA, shipping over 200,000 copies.

Track listing

Charts

Certifications

References

Guns N' Roses video albums
Geffen Records video albums
1998 video albums